The New Zealand Subantarctic Islands comprise the five southernmost groups of the New Zealand outlying islands. They are collectively designated as a UNESCO World Heritage Site.

Most of the islands lie near the southeast edge of the largely submerged continent centred on New Zealand called Zealandia, which was riven from Australia 60–85 million years ago, and from Antarctica 85–130 million years ago. They share some features with Australia's Macquarie Island to the west.

History 
Until 1995, scientific research staff were stationed permanently at a meteorological station on Campbell Island. Since then, the islands have been uninhabited, though they are periodically visited by researchers and tourists. Protection of reserves was strengthened in 2014, becoming the largest natural sanctuary in the nation.

Islands 
 Antipodes Islands Antipodes Island, Bollons Island, the Windward Islands, Orde Lees Island, Leeward Island, South Islet
 Auckland Islands Auckland Island, Adams Island, Disappointment Island, Enderby Island, Ewing Island, Rose Island
 Bounty Islands Main Group, Centre Group, and Eastern Group islets
 Campbell Islands Campbell Island / Motu Ihupuku, Dent Island, Folly Island, Jacquemart Island
 Snares Islands / Tini Heke Alert Stack, Broughton Island, High Island, North East Island, Western Chain islets

Territorial claims 
New Zealand also has territorial claims, held in abeyance under the Antarctic Treaty System, over several islands close to the Antarctic mainland, including:

 Ross Island and the rest of the Ross Archipelago
 Balleny Islands: Young Island, Buckle Island, Sturge Island, plus several smaller islets
 Roosevelt Island
 Scott Island and Haggits Pillar

Of these, Ross Island is inhabited by the scientific staff of several research stations, notably at McMurdo Sound and Scott Base.

See also 
 List of Antarctic and subantarctic islands
 List of islands of New Zealand

References

External links 
 Subantarctic islands, Department of Conservation
 UNESCO classification for the sub-antarctic islands
 Castaways: Wrecked on a subantarctic island – Te Ara - the Encyclopedia of New Zealand

Archipelagoes of New Zealand
New Zealand outlying islands
 
Subantarctic islands
World Heritage Sites in New Zealand
Zealandia